Harold Bruce Bradshaw (8 August 1896 – October 1967) was an English footballer who played in the Football League for West Ham United.

References

1896 births
1967 deaths
English footballers
Association football forwards
English Football League players
West Ham United F.C. players